The Old Masonic Hall in Hazlehurst, Mississippi, also known as Golden Square Lodge No. 88, Prince Hall Affiliation, is a historic building that was designated a Mississippi Landmark in 2002.

While historically a meeting place for African American Freemasons, today no Masonic lodges meet in the building.  Neither of the Prince Hall Grand Lodges in Mississippi lists a "Golden Square Lodge No. 88" on their rosters.

References

Former Masonic buildings in Mississippi
Buildings and structures in Copiah County, Mississippi
Mississippi Landmarks